The Battle of the Pine is the name given in Greek Cypriot sources to an attack on a British army vehicle by the EOKA on 24 November 1955, two days before the declaration of the Cyprus Emergency. A team of EOKA guerrillas ambushed the vehicles on the road from Kyperounda to Chandria killing one soldier, Sapper Robert Melson.

The next day British troops shot dead a Cypriot who approached the vehicle in which Downing died and failed to answer challenges from British soldiers.

This was one of several comparable incidents at the times which resulted in the deaths of several British servicemen and contributed to the declaration of a State of Emergency on the island.

References

the Pine
Cyprus Emergency
1955 in Cyprus
November 1955 events in Europe